Ramanand Singh (born 25 June 1937) is an Indian politician. He was member 12th and 13th Lok Sabha representing BJP from Satna constituency of Madhya Pradesh. In 1967, he became a member of Rajya Sabha for the first time. In 1977 he became Cabinet Minister in Government of Madhya Pradesh for Forest, Local Self-Government, Public Health and Engineering Department in Janata Party government.

Positions held

References
http://www.indiapress.org/election/archives/lok12/biodata/12mp08.php

1937 births
Lok Sabha members from Madhya Pradesh
People from Satna district
Madhya Pradesh MLAs 1977–1980
Bharatiya Janata Party politicians from Madhya Pradesh
Living people